Aleksey Sergeyevich Makarov (born 20 August 1987) is a Russian beach soccer player currently active as a forward.

Career
Makarov began his professional beach soccer team in the FC Strogino club. For a short period he played for FC Delta Saratov in 2010, but then switched to Lokomotive Moscow where he has been playing since 2010. His first coach was Aleksey Grishin. Makarov debuted for the national team in the qualifying rounds of the 2007 Euro Beach Soccer League.

Makarov played for Lokomotive from 2010 to 2018. He switched to Spartak Moscow in 2018. On his debut game within the new club at the Moscow Indoor Championships on 4 March 2018 Makarov also shot his first goal against Strogino.

Personal life
When graduating at the Children's and Youth Sports School "Strogino", Makarov had the options to either start a sports career, or enter a university, choosing the latter. He enrolled in a university and graduated with a degree of "civil structural engineer" after defending his diploma with excellence.

Achievements
Some of Makarov's notable achievements:

National team
FIFA Beach Soccer World Cup champion: 2011, 2013, 2021
Beach Soccer Intercontinental Cup champion: 2011, 2012, 2015
Euro Beach Soccer Cup champion: 2010, 2012
Euro Beach Soccer League champion: 2009, 2011, 2013, 2014, 2017

Clubs
Russian National champion: 2005, 2008, 2009, 2010, 2011, 2012, 2021
Russian Cup champion: 2008, 2009, 2011, 2012, 2013, 2016
Russian Super Cup: 2011

Individually
2017 Euro Beach Soccer League, Stage 3 – Best Player
Merited Master of Sports (21 December 2012).

References

External links
Profile on Beach Soccer Russia
Profile on FC Lokomotiv 

Russian beach soccer players
1987 births
Living people
Sportspeople from Moscow
European Games gold medalists for Russia
Beach soccer players at the 2015 European Games
European Games medalists in beach soccer
Beach soccer players at the 2019 European Games